Kenneth George Moody (12 November 1924 – 1990) was an English professional footballer who played as a full-back.

References

1924 births
1990 deaths
Footballers from Grimsby
English footballers
Association football fullbacks
Humber United F.C. players
Grimsby Town F.C. players
Peterborough United F.C. players
English Football League players